SMS Luchs was the fourth member of the  of gunboats built for the German Kaiserliche Marine (Imperial Navy) in the late 1890s and early 1900s.  Other ships of the class are SMS Iltis, SMS Tiger, SMS Eber, SMS Jaguar and SMS Panther.

Design
	

She displaced  at full load. Her propulsion system consisted of a pair of vertical triple-expansion steam engines each driving a single screw propeller, with steam supplied by four coal-fired Thornycroft boilers. She had a crew of 9 officers and 121 enlisted men. Luchs was armed with a main battery of two  SK L/40 guns, with 482 rounds of ammunition. She also carried six machine guns.

Service history

Luchs was laid down at the Kaiserliche Werft (Imperial Shipyard) in Danzig in 1898. She was launched on 18 October 1899 and commissioned into the German fleet on 15 May 1900. She was initially assigned to the American Station, along with the protected cruiser  and the unprotected cruiser .

In August 1904, the badly damaged Russian battleship Tsesarevich and three destroyers sought refuge in the German naval base at Tsingtao following the Russian defeat in the Battle of the Yellow Sea. As Germany was neutral, the East Asia Squadron interned Tsesarevich and the destroyers. On 13 August, the Russian ships restocked their coal supplies from three British steamers, but the armored cruiser  and the protected cruiser  cleared for action to prevent them from leaving the port.

Luchs spent December 1909 and early January 1910 in Hong Kong for the Christmas and New Year's festivities in company with the armored cruiser  and the light cruiser . In January, Scharnhorst, Leipzig, and Luchs went on a tour of East Asian ports, including Bangkok, Manila, and stops in Sumatra and North Borneo. By 22 March, Scharnhorst and Leipzig had returned to the German port at Tsingtao.

Luchs was scuttled on 28 September 1914 at the German colony in the Kiautschou Bay concession during the Siege of Tsingtao. Three of her sisters were also scuttled during the siege, including , which was scuttled the same day as Luchs.

Notes

References

Further reading

1899 ships
Ships built in Danzig
Iltis-class gunboats
World War I naval ships of Germany
Maritime incidents in September 1914
Scuttled vessels of Germany
World War I shipwrecks in the Pacific Ocean
Shipwrecks of China